Francesco Grimaldi (Oppido Lucano, 1543 – Naples, 1 August 1613) was an Italian Theatine Order priest and architect, working mainly in Naples.

Among his designs are works for:

Covent of the Theatine Order (1590) at the church of Santi Apostoli.
Church of Santi Apostoli, which resembles Sant'Andrea della Valle in Rome.
Cappella del Tesoro (1608) in the Cathedral of Naples
Church of Santa Maria degli Angioli a Pizzo-Falcone.
Church of the Trinità delle Monache.
Church of the San Paolo.
Sant'Andrea delle Dame, Naples

Sources

1543 births
1613 deaths
Theatines
Architects from Naples
16th-century Italian architects
17th-century Italian architects
People from the Province of Potenza
Italian Renaissance architects